The Avon, formerly known as Dunolly, was a 1,572 ton, iron sailing ship with a length of 255.6 feet, breadth of 37.6 feet and depth of 22.6 feet. She was built by Charles Connell of Glasgow in 1884 for John Brown of Glasgow. The Nourse Line bought the ship in 1890 and renamed it the Avon after the River Avon in the south west of England. She was primarily used by the Nourse Line for the transportation of Indian indentured labourers to the colonies. Details of some of these voyages are as follows:

Avon was a fast ship, sailing from Calcutta to St Helena in 62 days.

See also 
Indian Indenture Ships to Fiji

External links 
 AVON picture
Immigrant Ships Transcribers Guild British Guiana             
Immigrant Ships Transcribers Guild: Trinidad
Genealogy.com

Bibliography 

History of Guyana
History of Suriname
Indian indentureship in Trinidad and Tobago
Indian indenture ships to Fiji
Victorian-era passenger ships of the United Kingdom
Individual sailing vessels
1884 ships
Sailing ships of Scotland
Ships built in Glasgow